The Byrdine F. Lewis College of Nursing and Health Professions contains the nursing school and school of allied health professions at Georgia State University.

History
The school is named after Byrdine F. Lewis, the mother of Kenneth Lewis, a former CEO of Bank of America and an alumnus of Georgia State.  Ken's mother was a nurse, and he donated $2.5 million as an endowment in her honor. The school was originally part of the College of Health and Human Sciences, but was restructured to its current configuration. The School of Nursing's offices are located in the Urban Life Building, along with the College of Law. On August 1st, 2017, the institute was renamed from Byrdine F. Lewis School of Nursing and Health Professions to Byrdine F. Lewis College of Nursing and Health Professions

Degree programs
 Health Informatics
 Nursing
 Nutrition
 Occupational Therapy
 Physical Therapy
 Respiratory Therapy

Nursing
The School of Nursing within the college offers degrees in nursing leading to eligibility to become a registered nurse or an advanced practice registered nurse.

Undergraduate
 Traditional Bachelor of Science in Nursing
 Accelerated Bachelor of Science in Nursing
 RN to BS Online Bridge Program

Graduate
 Master of Science in Nursing
 Adult health clinical nurse specialist / Adult nurse practitioner
 Child health clinical nurse specialist / Pediatric nurse practitioner
 Family nurse practitioner
 Family psychiatric-mental health nurse practitioner
 Nursing leadership in healthcare innovations
 Post-Master’s Certificate
 Adult health clinical nurse specialist / Adult nurse practitioner
 Child health clinical nurse specialist / Pediatric nurse practitioner
 Family nurse practitioner
 Family psychiatric-mental health nurse practitioner
 RN to MS Bridge Program
 Doctor of Nursing Practice
 Doctor of Philosophy

Nutrition
The school offers degrees in clinical nutrition leading to eligibility to become a registered dietitian

Undergraduate
 Bachelor of Science - Didactic Program in Dietetics

Graduate
 Master of Science - Didactic Program
 Master of Science - Coordinated Program

Physical therapy
The school offers the Doctor of physical therapy degree.

Occupational therapy
The school offers a Master of Occupational Therapy degree.

Respiratory therapy
The school offers degrees in respiratory therapy leading to eligibility to become a Certified Respiratory Therapist or Registered Respiratory Therapist

Undergraduate
 Bachelor of Science in Respiratory Care
 AS to BS Online Bridge Program

Graduate
 Master of Science in Health Sciences
 Respiratory Therapy Integrated Bachelor’s to master's degree Program

References

Nursing schools in Georgia (U.S. state)
Georgia State University
Physiotherapy organizations
Respiratory therapy
Dietetics